The FC Basel 1902–03 season was their tenth season in their existence. The club's chairman was Ernst-Alfred Thalmann, who had taken over the position for the second time, he stood down at the AGM and Josy Ebinger was elected. He became the fifth chairman in the club's history. FC Basel first played their home games in the Thiersteinerallee and later they returned to the Landhof.

Overview

Football ground 
To the start of the previous season the club was forced to find a new playing field, because the new co-tenants of the Landhof built a concrete bowling alley in the middle of the grounds. Thus the FC Basel first and reserve teams then had to play their games elsewhere. They eventually found a suitable field beside the Thiersteinerallee, in the south-east of the city. To the beginning of the 1902–03 Swiss Serie A season the teams also played their games there. Towards the end of the year 1902 the club met an agreement with the owner of the Landhof, Mrs Katharina Ehrler-Wittich, and the club was able to return to their original domicile. At the cost of 150 Swiss Francs the club members removed the bowling alley and made the pitch playable once again.

Football season 
Alphonse Schorpp was the team captain for the third successive season and as captain he led the team trainings and was responsible for the line-ups. There is no documentation that shows that there were pre-season friendly games this season, although the domestic league did not start until November. However, because the league season ended early there were friendlies added directly afterwards. A curiosity that comes to note is, that there were two games against French team Mulhouse. Directly after the league group had been completed, the first game at the Landhof was won 8–1 and had five different goal scorers. The return match, held just two weeks later, was lost 0–5.

The Swiss Serie A season 1902–03 was divided into three regional groups. There were six teams in the east group, five teams in the central and four teams in the west group. Basel were allocated to the central group together with two teams from the capital Young Boys and FC Bern and two further teams from region Basel, these being Old Boys Basel and Fortuna Basel. A curiosity during the championship was the match against Fortuna. The game was abandoned in the 70th minute, because the Fortuna players left the field in protest against a sending off. The referee commission, which was responsible in such cases as a court of arbitration, decided let the score count as end result. Fortuna were later disqualified by the Swiss Football Association due to incidents in the match against Old Boys. The decision was that the results of the previously played matches would remain in the league table, but the remaining matches were not played and not awarded. 

Basel completed the central division as the only team with eight games. They had three victories and five defeats with thus six points, 13 to 20 goals. Basel were in third position in the table, six points behind Young Boys who won the group one point ahead of Old Boys. Young Boys therefore qualified for the finals. Here YB won both matches and became Swiss champions.

Players

Results 

Legend

Friendly matches

End of season

Serie A

Central group matches

Central group league table

See also 
 History of FC Basel
 List of FC Basel players
 List of FC Basel seasons

Notes

References

Sources 
 Rotblau: Jahrbuch Saison 2014/2015. Publisher: FC Basel Marketing AG. 
 Die ersten 125 Jahre. Publisher: Josef Zindel im Friedrich Reinhardt Verlag, Basel. 
 FCB squad 1902-03 at Basler Fussballarchiv
 Switzerland 1902-03 at RSSSF
(NB: Despite all efforts, the editors of these books and the authors in "Basler Fussballarchiv" have failed to be able to identify all the players, their date and place of birth or date and place of death, who played in the games during the early years of FC Basel. Most of the documentation is incomplete.)

External links 
 FC Basel official site

FC Basel seasons
Basel